Eupithecia encoensis is a moth in the family Geometridae. It is found in the Region of Los Lagos (Valdivia and Osorno provinces) in Chile. The habitat consists of the Valdivian Forest Biotic Province.

The length of the forewings is about 11-11.5 mm for females. The forewings are brown with blackish brown scaling. The hindwings are pale brownish grey, with brown and blackish brown scaling along the anal margin and the outer margin. Adults have been recorded on wing in January and February.

Etymology
The specific name is based on the type locality.

References

Moths described in 1987
encoensis
Moths of South America
Endemic fauna of Chile